In enzymology, a CDP-glycerol diphosphatase is an enzyme that catalyzes the chemical reaction

CDP-glycerol + H2O  CMP + sn-glycerol 3-phosphate

Thus, the two substrates of this enzyme are CDP-glycerol and H2O, whereas its two products are CMP and sn-glycerol 3-phosphate.

This enzyme belongs to the family of hydrolases, specifically those acting on acid anhydrides in phosphorus-containing anhydrides.  The systematic name of this enzyme class is CDP-glycerol phosphoglycerohydrolase. Other names in common use include CDP-glycerol pyrophosphatase, and cytidine diphosphoglycerol pyrophosphatase.  This enzyme participates in glycerophospholipid metabolism.

References 

 

EC 3.6.1
Enzymes of unknown structure